Thomas John Thomas OBE (born 1877) was a Welsh international footballer. He was part of the Wales national football team, playing 2 matches. He played his first match on 19 February 1898 against Ireland and his last match on 19 March 1898 against Scotland .

He studied at the Friars School, Bangor.

He became an Officer of the Order of the British Empire. He was ranked colonel of the Australian Army during World War I and had as post being finance member of the Australian Military Board in October 1920. He received the OBE (selected) Australian War Honour that year.

See also
 List of Wales international footballers (alphabetical)

References

1877 births
Welsh footballers
Wales international footballers
Place of birth missing
Year of death missing
Association footballers not categorized by position
Australian Officers of the Order of the British Empire
Australian military personnel of World War I
Australian colonels